Ram Avtar Singh is an Indian politician from the Samajwadi Party serving as a member of the Uttar Pradesh Legislative Assembly from the Noorpur Assembly constituency since 2022.

References

Living people
Samajwadi Party politicians from Uttar Pradesh
Members of the Uttar Pradesh Legislative Assembly

Year of birth missing (living people)